Feehily is a surname. Notable people with the surname include:

Fergus Feehily (born 1968), Irish artist
Mark Feehily (born 1980), Irish singer
Stella Feehily (born 1969), Irish playwright and actor